Islam in the Cook Islands is a small religious minority in the New Zealand dependency of the Cook Islands. It's not exactly clear how many Muslims there are in the Cook Islands, because the calculation of Muslims doesn't participate in the country census. However, it is estimated that about 0.06% of the islands' population of about 15000 is Muslim. There are no mosques in the Islands. It is unclear how Islam first appeared in the Cook Islands. One of the earliest Cook Islanders to convert to Islam is Tatiana Kautai. Islam is a small but growing religious minority in the Cook Islands.

See also
Islam in New Zealand

References 

Cook Islands
Cook Islands
Cook Islands